3X1 is a Hong Kong television drama series produced by HK Television Entertainment, and broadcast by ViuTV.

The series is the second self-made drama series to be aired on ViuTV, and it premiered on 25 July 2016.

Synopsis 
The story is set in a Hong Kong that is facing a worsening economic climate, and it revolves around a retail space that is leased to three businesses, each operating during a different time of the day.

The businesses include:
 GOGOGO YOGA: a business that offers Yoga courses and personal training. It operates from 7 to 11AM
 Party of Two: a restaurant that offers pay what you want pricing until Episode 28. It operates from noon to 10PM
 Vincent Cafe: a coffee shop that offers live music. It operates from midnight to 5AM.

Each episode deals exclusively with one of the three businesses, with limited crossover between the characters.

Cast members

GOGOGO YOGA 
 King (Portrayed by Brian Chan): Co-owner and personal trainer. He is Jenny Chan's boyfriend.
 Jenny Chan (陳珍妮, portrayed by Kate Yeung): Co-owner, and a Yoga instructor. He is King's girlfriend.

Party of Two 
 Mok Chee Fan (莫志凡, portrayed by Neo Yau Hawk-Sau): The restaurant's co-owner.
 Christian Yang (楊拓也, portrayed by Christian Yang): The restaurant's interim chef. Once worked for Michelin-starred eateries. The actor who portrays this character is a real life chef.
 Chan Yook Ping (陳旭平): The restaurant's co-owner, returned from overseas on the 28th episode.

Vincent Cafe 
 Wong Mei Ling (黃美玲, portrayed by Irene Wan in the present day, and by Scarlett Wong in flashbacks): The cafe's owner. She was once an agent for musicians.
 Fah (花, portrayed by  Gladys Li), a worker at Vincent Cafe, and its live singer. Her mother is Wong Mei Ling.

Other cast members 
 Yuki (Portrayed by Hey Rachel): Fah's good friend. She died before a song she created was to be featured in a movie. The actress who portrays this character is a real life musician.
 Wilson (Portrayed by Law Wing-cheung): A movie producer who decided to cut Yuki's song from his movie. He eventually changed his mind, on the condition that Fah sings the song as a duet.
 Bondy Chiu: A frequent customer of Vincent Cafe. Chiu portrays herself in the series.

References 

2016 Hong Kong television series debuts
Hong Kong drama television series
2010s Hong Kong television series
ViuTV dramas